Manuela Maleeva-Fragniere and Leila Meskhi were the defending champions. Maleeva-Fragniere retired from tennis earlier that year, but only Meskhi competed that year with Eugenia Maniokova.

Maniokova and Meskhi lost in the quarterfinals to Larisa Neiland and Arantxa Sánchez Vicario.

Neiland and Sánchez Vicario won in the final 6–2, 6–7, 6–4 against Amanda Coetzer and Inés Gorrochategui.

Seeds
Champion seeds are indicated in bold text while text in italics indicates the round in which those seeds were eliminated. The top four seeded teams received byes into the second round.

Draw

Final

Top half

Bottom half

External links
 ITF tournament edition details 

Amelia Island Championships
1994 WTA Tour